Microspherule protein 1 is a protein that in humans is encoded by the MCRS1 gene.

Interactions 

MCRS1 has been shown to interact with PHC2, Death associated protein 6, NOL1, PINX1 and Telomerase reverse transcriptase.

References

Further reading